The 2003–04 European Nations Cup was the fourth edition of the newly reformed European Championship for tier 2 and 3 rugby union nations. This was the second two-year cycled championship, the first to be planned from the start.

The title was won by Portugal for the first time, with their Iberian neighbours Spain being relegated. Portugal won all their games, except to a loss abroad to Romania. The Championship saw another new face in the Czech Republic who replaced the relegated Netherlands.

Table

Results

Week 1

The match between the Czech Republic and Romania, originally scheduled for 15 February, was postponed.

Week 2

The match between the Czech Republic and Russia, originally scheduled for 22 February, was postponed.

Week 3

Week 4

Week 5

Week 6

Week 7

The game between Russia and the Czech Republic, originally scheduled for 21 February 2004 and postponed due to snow, was not played.

Week 8

Week 9

Week 10

See also
2002–04 European Nations Cup Second Division
2002–03 European Nations Cup Third Division
2003–04 European Nations Cup Third Division

External links
2003-04 European Nations Cup First Division at ESPN

2003–04
2002–03 in European rugby union
2003–04 in European rugby union
2002–03 in Spanish rugby union
2003–04 in Spanish rugby union
2003 in Russian rugby union
2004 in Russian rugby union
2003 in Georgian sport
2004 in Georgian sport
2003 in Dutch sport
2004 in Dutch sport
2002–03 in Romanian rugby union
2003–04 in Romanian rugby union
2003 in Portuguese sport
2004 in Portuguese sport